St Matthias Church is a Grade II listed Anglican church in Richmond, London. It was built in the Victorian Gothic style in 1857, and is described by Bridget Cherry and Nikolaus Pevsner as "the grandest church in Richmond". The architect was George Gilbert Scott.

The church is dedicated to Saint Matthias who was, according to the Acts of the Apostles, chosen by the apostles to replace Judas Iscariot following the latter's betrayal of Jesus and his subsequent death.

The church building is located at the top of Richmond Hill at the intersection of Friars Stile Road, Kings Road, and Church Road. At , the spire of the church is a familiar landmark for miles around.

The church was renovated in the 1970s by the architects Hutchison, Locke & Monk.

St Matthias' Church is part of the Richmond Team Ministry, which also includes the churches of St John the Divine and St Mary Magdalene.

Gallery

References

External links
 
 Britain from Above image:  St Matthias' Church, Richmond, August 1928
 

1857 establishments in England
19th-century Church of England church buildings
Richmond
Richmond
Churches completed in 1857
George Gilbert Scott buildings
Gothic Revival church buildings in London
Grade II listed churches in the London Borough of Richmond upon Thames
Richmond, London